Madawaska Les Lacs-Edmundston is a provincial electoral district for the Legislative Assembly of New Brunswick, Canada.

The district was established in 1973 as Madawaska les Lacs when New Brunswick moved from a system of bloc voting to the first past the post electoral system.  It had previously been a part of the Madawaska County electoral district which returned three members.

It the 1994 electoral redistribution, it added parts of the old district of Madawaska Centre and it underwent only very minor boundary changes in 2006.

In 2013, it added more of the city of Edmundston to its boundaries and was renamed.

It was formerly one of the safest francophone seats in New Brunswick for the Progressive Conservatives.  It was held by the PCs in every election since it was created except for the 1987 election (in which the Liberals won every seat) and the 1991 election (in which the PCs won only 3 seats and the main opposition was the conservative Confederation of Regions Party which opposed official status for the French language). Recently, it has elected Liberal MLAs. Its current MLA is Francine Landry of the Liberal Party.

Members of the Legislative Assembly

Election results

Madawaska Les Lacs-Edmundston

Madawaska les Lacs

External links
Legislative Assembly of New Brunswick
Map of riding as of 2018

References

New Brunswick provincial electoral districts
Politics of Edmundston